Ivaylo Zahariev (Bulgarian: Ивайло Захариев) is а Bulgarian actor, known for the lead role of the undercover cop Martin in the BNT 1 series Pod Prikritie which was sold in 184 territories on 3 continents. Ivaylo is popular with his active support to causes related to addictions prevention, access to information and culture of the deaf community, rights of children and youth, protection of marriage as a social value, Christian values and others.

Early life 
In 2003, Zahariev graduated 151st SOUPI, profile "Drama Theater" in Sofia and then (in 2007), "National Academy Krastyo Sarafov" with a degree in acting in the class of professor . During the training involved in the play "Manners Table" (Tom) "Being Dzheymi Fostar" (Leon), "Ivanov" (Ivanov) and the films "good students" (Leung) in the story of Boris Vian, Director Vito Bonev "Sofia-Amsterdam" (Husband) and other student productions.

After graduation, Zahariev became a freelance actor taking part in private projects and as a guest artist in theater groups. He also worked in commercials, television and film productions, and in March 2014, he debuted as guest host in "Up Close with Maria" on National Television.

Zahariev caught his big break and acquired popularity with a starring role in the television crime series Undercover at BNT. He has been a member of the Union of Artists in Bulgaria since 2012.

Productions involving professional include "Iron Candlestick" of MDT Veliko Tarnovo, director Dimiter Sharkov (as Lazarus), "Savior" - part project of Theater group "gang" directed by Valentin Balabanov (as spas) "Agents" in the play Glengarry Glen Ross by David Mamet, produced by Drama "Vasil Drumev" Shoumen director Vladimir Penev (as Ricky Roma), several sign language theater project "Mime art" and others.

Career 

His debut on the big screen in the role of Alex in the film "Number 1" produced by BNT directed by Atanas Hristoskov. It comes to student violence, amid loud BG Hip Hop. This would hardly be the role, which will be remembered for the talented actor.

Personal life 
Ivaylo Zahariev was born on October 4, 1984, and grew up in Nadezhda neighborhood of the capital city of Sofia in the family of Rumyanka and Vasil Zahariev. He has an older brother - Alexander. In 2012, he married Miryana after a brief relationship. He has two sons Philip and Damyan.

Ivaylo defines himself as Christian Protestant. He speaks openly about his faith in God and regularly attends Sunday services.

Filmography

FIlm and television

Music video

Social activities 

Ivaylo Zahariev is dedicated to helping drug addicts in the ministry "Exit". Together with his best friend Ivo Oreshkov - wedding photographer - and other friends organize weekly meetings for people looking for a way out of problems with addictions.

In 2013 and 2014, along with his family, he is active in protests against the cabinet "Oresharski 'as a member of" protest network. " It includes initiatives of the Foundation for Social Change and inclusion, Teach, Holiday Heroes, Bulgarian Book Association, az-deteto.com and others.

References 

1984 births
Living people
Male actors from Sofia
Bulgarian male television actors
21st-century Bulgarian male actors